Verano de amor (English title: Summer of Love) is a Mexican telenovela produced by Televisa. It is a remake of a famous Argentine telenovela, Verano del 98, adapted for the Mexican audience. It premiered on February 9, 2009, and ended on July 24, 2009.

On April 15, 2019, Univision Tlnovelas started broadcasting "Verano de amor" weekdays at 7:00am/1:00pm/7:00pm with a marathon of episodes every Sunday at 7:00am replacing "Así son ellas" the last episode was broadcast on September 27, 2019, with "El juego de la vida" replacing it the following day.

Plot and themes
Verano de amor is the story of four teenagers who have always lived in the city of Tlacotalpan, Veracruz, Mexico.  The story's message emphasizes the distinction between the importance of pursuing one's dreams and the importance of pursuing material things.  The show's creators chose Tlacotalpan for its setting in large part because of its natural beauty; the storyline of Verano de amor incorporates messages promoting environmentalism, an extension of Televisa's "Televisa Verde" initiative focused on the environment.

Cast
Dulce María as Miranda Perea Olmos de Villalba
Gonzalo García Vivanco as Mauro Villalba Duarte
Christina Masón as Zoé Palma
Brandon Peniche as Dylan Morett Carrasco
Pablo Lyle as Baldomero Perea Olmos
Mark Tacher as Dante Escudero
Victória Díaz Arango as Flora Palma
Lola Merino as Sofía Duarte
Ana Layevska as Valéria Michel
Enrique Rocha as 'Vito Rocca Provenzano
Juan Ferrara as Othon Villalba de Limonquí
Luz Maria Jeréz as Aura De Rocca
María Fernanda García as Reyna Olmos
Felipe Nájera as Federico Carrasco
Sharis Cid as Frida Morett de Carrasco
Manuel Landeta as Marcos Casar
Rebeca Manríquez as Zulema Esdregal
Ariane Pellicer as Adelina Olmos
Manuel Ojeda as Clemente Matus
Ari Borovoy as Elías Lobo
Analía del Mar as Feliciana Clavería
Lourdes Canale as Etelvina Garcia González
Juan Carlos Muñóz as Santino Rocca
Rebeca Mankita as Lina Corvalán
Jorge Ortín as Adriano Bonfiglio
Maria Elisa Camargo as Isabela Rocca
Viviana Macouzet as Jennifer Montili
Alan Estrada as Fabián Escudero
Natasha Dupeyrón as Berenice Perea Olmos
Imanol Landeta as Daniel Gurzan
Carlos Speitzer as Narciso Sotelo Peréz
Karla Souza as Dana Villalba Duarte
Yago Muñoz as Enzo Rocca
Esmeralda Pimentel as Adalberta Claveria
Andréa Muñoz as Milena Carrasco
Manelick de la Parra as Bruno Carrasco
Alicia Moreno as Sol Montili
Héctor de la Peña as Rocco Levín
Martín Barba as Jordí Heidi
Michelle as Brisa Palma
Juan José Origel as Bruno Gallaza
Yessica Salazar as Giovanna Reyes
Araceli Mali as Fátima Villalobos
Samantha López as Eugénia Villalobos
Carmen Rodriguez as Eva Rocca
Fernando Robles as Donato Vallejo
Lourdes Munguía as Violeta Palma
Alejandro Peraza as Custódio Santoscoy
Rebeca Mankita as Celina Carrasco
Verónica Jaspeado as Greta Perea Olmos
Andrea Torre as Sandra Palacios
Archi Lanfranco as William
José Carlos Femat as Bobby
Santiago Toledo as Iván
Arturo de la Garza as Armando
Ana Isabel Meraza as Felicitas
Michelle Renaud as Débora
Ilse Ikeda as Palmira
Mónica Blanchet as Virgínia
Rubén Cerda as Rubén
Pedro Damián as Benito
Bruno Danzza as Santos Diablitos
Patricia Cantú as Paty
Juan Manuel Puerto as Oso
José Blanchet as José
Pope Lopto as Pope
Axel Valero as Axel
Mark Batak as Mark

Special guests
Christopher Uckermann
Wisin & Yandel
Axel
Paty Cantú

Theme songs
The theme "El Verano" performed by Dulce Maria, is the main theme of the telenovela, which sounds both at the entrance and in the end credits.

As the novel progressed, new themes are introduced, for example: "Light up the world tonight" (by Christopher Uckermann) and "I want my life" (by the fictional band Bikini's).

With the premiere of the second season, also premiered the new song of the telenovela, "Déjame Ser", also starring Dulce María, which is used at the entrance of the telenovela.

Awards and nominations

International broadcasts

References

Mexican telenovelas
Televisa telenovelas
2009 telenovelas
2009 Mexican television series debuts
2009 Mexican television series endings
Mexican television series based on Argentine television series
Spanish-language telenovelas